During the Parade of Nations portion of the 1964 Summer Olympics opening ceremony, athletes from each country participating in the Olympics paraded in the arena, preceded by their flag. The flag was borne by a sportsperson from that country chosen either by the National Olympic Committee or by the athletes themselves to represent their country. Although the Games were held in Japan, English was used to organize the Parade of Nations instead of Japanese. Had the parade followed the Japanese characters, Greece would have been followed by Iceland, and Rhodesia would have been the penultimate country before Japan. The Japanese language order would not be introduced until 2020 when the country hosted the games for the second time.

List

See also
 2020 Summer Olympics Parade of Nations, also in Tokyo, Japan.
 1998 Winter Olympics Parade of Nations

References

External links
 Sports-reference.com
Home Movies - Tokyo Olympics 1964 Part 2 of 4
Home Movies - Tokyo Olympics 1964 Part 3 of 4
The Olympic History - Tokyo 1964 part 1

1964 Summer Olympics
Lists of Olympic flag bearers